Joy Allison Taylor (born January 17, 1987) is an American media personality and television host for Fox Sports 1. She is currently the co-host of Speak with LeSean McCoy and Emmanuel Acho. Taylor was the news update anchor on Fox Sports 1's The Herd with Colin Cowherd, and the host of The Joy Taylor Show Saturdays on Fox Sports Radio.

Taylor previously served as the moderator for Fox Sports 1's studio show Skip and Shannon: Undisputed with commentators Skip Bayless and Shannon Sharpe.

Early years
Taylor attended Barry University, where she graduated with a Bachelor of Arts in broadcast communications in 2009. Taylor was the host of radio show The Noise and serving as the manager for her alma mater's radio station WBRY 1640 AM while finishing her degree.

Career
Taylor previously worked three years at 790 AM The Ticket in Miami, where she began as the executive producer, then eventually became the co-host for the station's top-rated morning-drive sports radio show, Zaslow and Joy Show. Taylor also served as the host of Fantasy Football Today and Thursday Night Live on CBSSports.com. Taylor joined FOX Sports in March 2016, playing pinch-hitter in several different FS1 roles, including filling in for Kristine Leahy on The Herd with Colin Cowherd. On August 15, 2016, it was announced by Fox Sports that Taylor would be the moderator for Fox Sports 1's upcoming sports debate show Skip and Shannon: Undisputed with commentators Skip Bayless and former NFL tight end and former CBS sports analyst Shannon Sharpe. She also hosts The Hang on Facebook Live and her Podcast “Maybe I’m Crazy.” In 2018, Fox announced that starting June 18, Taylor would be moving from Undisputed to The Herd with Colin Cowherd, also airing on FS1 along with Fox Sports Radio.

On September 9, 2021, it was announced that Taylor would be the host of her own Saturday program, The Joy Taylor Show on Fox Sports Radio.

Taylor began cohosting "Speak" on FS1 on September 6, 2022.

Personal life
Taylor's brother is former NFL defensive end Jason Taylor, who played 15 seasons in the National Football League and was voted into the Pro Football Hall of Fame in 2017.

Joy Taylor revealed that she had been a victim of domestic abuse during an episode of Undisputed in 2017. In September 2018, it was announced that Taylor was engaged to former NBA point guard and head coach Earl Watson but the couple split in November 2019.

References

External links
Fox Sports 1 Profile

1987 births
American women podcasters
American podcasters
American sports radio personalities
Barry University alumni
Fox Sports 1 people
Living people
Radio personalities from Pittsburgh
Women sports commentators
21st-century American women